Mikkel Grundtvig (born 30 June 2002) is a Danish racing driver, currently competing in the GB3 Championship for Fortec Motorsport.

Career

Karting 
Grundtvig started racing in karting competitions in 2015, when he drove in the Danish Rotax Max Challenge. He remained in karts until 2016.

Lower formulae 
In 2017 Grundtvig made his single-seater debut in the Aquila Synergy Cup with Young Factory Racing. The Dane scored his first podium in the second race at Karlskoga, and achieved two victories at the final two races of the season. Grundtvig finished the campaign in third place, 67 points behind the champion Kevin Suenson.

For 2018, Grundtvig progressed to the F4 Danish Championship, driving for Apex Racing. However, despite five podium finishes of the course of the season, he only managed to end up seventh in the standings. Grundtvig remained with Apex for parts of the 2019 season, whilst also competing in the French F4 Championship. The Dane would fare significantly better in the former than the previous year, winning three races and scoring a further five podiums, whilst in the French series he would come out victorious at the reversed-grid race at Lédenon and finished the year 13th in the championship.

Danish Touring Cars 
In 2020 Grundtvig raced in Class 4 of the Danish Endurance Championship. After finishing six of the seven races on the podium and winning a total of three races he won the title in comfortable fashion.

GB3 Championship 
Grundtvig made the step-up to race in the GB3 Championship in 2021, partnering Roberto Faria at Fortec Motorsports. He scored his first podium of the season along with his first win at Donington Park, where he held off Max Marzorati to take victory. The following round at Spa-Francochamps the Dane achieved a second place in the reversed-grid race, completing a Fortec one-two lockout along with teammate Faria. Grundtvig's third podium of the campaign came at the final race at Oulton Park, where he yet again finished second. After two 14th places in the first two races at the final round at Donington Park, Grundtvig won the final race of the season, having started from pole position due to the reversing of the qualifying order. He finished the season 13th in the standings, eight positions behind his only full-time teammate Faria.

Karting record

Karting career summary

Racing record

Racing career summary 

* Season still in progress.

Complete F4 Danish Championship results 
(key) (Races in bold indicate pole position) (Races in italics indicate fastest lap)

Complete French F4 Championship results
(key) (Races in bold indicate pole position) (Races in italics indicate fastest lap)

Complete GB3 Championship results 
(key) (Races in bold indicate pole position) (Races in italics indicate fastest lap)

* Season still in progress.

References

External links 

 

2002 births
Living people
Danish racing drivers
BRDC British Formula 3 Championship drivers
People from Vejle Municipality
Sportspeople from the Region of Southern Denmark
French F4 Championship drivers
Fortec Motorsport drivers
Danish F4 Championship drivers